Ramularia tenella is a fungus.

References

tenella
Fungal plant pathogens and diseases
Fungi described in 2006